Eric Selleck (born October 20, 1987) is a Canadian professional ice hockey player. He is currently an unrestricted free agent who most recently was under contract with the Norfolk Admirals of the ECHL.

Playing career
Prior to turning professional, Selleck attended the State University of New York at Oswego where he played two seasons of NCAA Division III college hockey. On April 21, 2010, the Florida Panthers signed Selleck as a free agent to a two-way, two-year entry level contract.

During the midpoint of the lockout shortened 2012–13 season, Selleck received his first NHL recall from the Panthers on March 19, 2013. He would be ejected from the game in the third period for instigating a fight with Hurricanes forward Kevin Westgarth.

In the 2013–14 season, on March 2, 2014, Selleck was traded to the St. Louis Blues in return for Mark Mancari.

As a free agent and unable to attain a NHL contract, Selleck signed a one-year AHL contract with the Portland Pirates, an affiliate of the Arizona Coyotes, on August 19, 2014. In the 2014–15 season, Selleck enjoyed his best season as a professional, recording a career high 23 points in 74 games with the Pirates.

On July 3, 2015, Selleck remained within the Coyotes organization, signing as a free agent to a one-year, two-way contract with Arizona.

At the completion of the 2015–16 season, Selleck was again out of contract with the Coyotes. On August 5, 2016, Selleck signed a one-year AHL contract with the Coyotes new affiliate, the Tucson Roadrunners. In the 2016–17 season, Selleck dropped his production offensively, falling to 5 goals and 9 points in 46 games.

As a free agent from the Roadrunners in the following off-season, Selleck continued in the AHL by agreeing to a one-year deal with the Hartford Wolf Pack on July 28, 2017. In the 2017–18 season, Selleck in a depth role struggled to find his scoring touch with the Wolf Pack, registering 3 goals in 32 games. On February 22, 2018, Selleck was traded by the Wolf Pack to the Belleville Senators for future considerations.

Following two seasons abroad in Slovakia with HC '05 Banská Bystrica of the Tipsport Extraliga (Slovak) and lower tiered club, Bratislava Capitals, Selleck opted to return to North America agreeing to extend his professional career in the ECHL with the Norfolk Admirals on September 15, 2020.

In 2021-22, Selleck played for the Gananoque Islanders of the Eastern Ontario Super Hockey League.

Career statistics

References

External links

1987 births
Living people
Arizona Coyotes players
HC '05 Banská Bystrica players
Belleville Senators players
Bratislava Capitals players
Canadian ice hockey left wingers
Chicago Wolves players
Florida Panthers players
Hartford Wolf Pack players
Ice hockey people from Ontario
People from Leeds and Grenville United Counties
Portland Pirates players
Rochester Americans players
San Antonio Rampage players
Springfield Falcons players
Tucson Roadrunners players
Undrafted National Hockey League players
Canadian expatriate ice hockey players in Slovakia
Canadian expatriate ice hockey players in the United States